Bolito, may refer to:

Bolita, the Spanish language word for little ball and a type of lottery
Bollito misto, an Italian cuisine dish of "mixed" boiled meats
Bollito de carita, a black eyed pea fritter
Bolito is a fictional, battery-powered decapitation device that appears in the 2013 Ridley Scott film "The Counselor".